The Egypt women's national field hockey team represents Egypt in women's international field hockey competitions.

Tournament record

Africa Cup of Nations
1998 – 4th place
2009 – 4th place
2017 – 5th place

See also
Egypt men's national field hockey team

References

External links
Official website
FIH profile

African women's national field hockey teams
Field hockey women
Women's sport in Egypt
National team